Justicia para Alan is a 2023 Peruvian documentary film written and directed by Ernesto Carlín. The film narrates the last months of the life of twice democratically elected president Alan García Pérez and analyzes the circumstances of his painful departure. The film didn't have financing from the Peruvian State.

Synopsis 
The film narrates and analyzes the last months of the life of President Alan García Pérez. It contains statements by the former Heads of State Rafael Correa (Ecuador), Álvaro Uribe (Colombia) and two ex-governors Julio María Sanguinetti and José Mujica (Uruguay), in addition to interviews with people close to the former APRA president.

Release 
The film had a private screening on February 18, 2023, as part of the Peruvian Aprista Party's festivities for Fraternity Month. It is scheduled to premiere commercially on April 20, 2023, in Peruvian theaters.

Controversy 
After the trailer was released on October 22, 2022, the director Ernesto Carlín pronounced that he received death threats, and that when he tried to file a complaint at a police station in Miraflores, they ignored him.

References

External links 

 

2023 films
2023 documentary films
Peruvian documentary films
Peruvian political films
2020s Spanish-language films
2020s Peruvian films
Films set in Peru
Films shot in Peru
Documentaries about politics